Mucronaria is a genus of gastropods belonging to the family Clausiliidae.

The species of this genus are found in Central Europe and Western Asia.

Species:

Mucronaria acuminata 
Mucronaria duboisi 
Mucronaria index 
Mucronaria pleuroptychia 
Mucronaria strauchi

References

Clausiliidae